Squaw Hill may refer to;

 Squaw Hill, California, a community
 Múmawet, a peak in California's Indio Hills formerly known as "Squaw Hill"